Project Independence was an initiative announced by U.S. President Richard Nixon on November 7, 1973, in reaction to the OAPEC oil embargo and the resulting 1973 oil crisis.  Recalling the Manhattan Project, he stated that the goal of Project Independence was to achieve energy self-sufficiency for the United States by 1980, through a national commitment to energy conservation and development of alternative sources of energy. Nixon declared that American science, technology and industry could free America from its dependence on imported oil, and establish its energy independence. He called for the construction of 1,000 nuclear power plants by the year 2000.

Despite these initiatives, Project Independence failed to prevent the increase in American oil consumption after the 1973–74 embargo; its dependence on foreign suppliers rose from 36% to almost 50% in 1979, when questions of nuclear energy safety arose domestically, and the next energy crisis emerged overseas.

References

Energy policy of the United States
Presidency of Richard Nixon
1973 in economics
1973 in American politics